Hargondi (also Romanized as Hargondī) is a village in Heruz Rural District, Kuhsaran District, Ravar County, Kerman Province, Iran. At the 2006 census, its population was 64, in 15 families.

References 

Populated places in Ravar County